The Augusta Rugby Football Club (ARFC) is a rugby union club in the Central Savannah River Area, Georgia in the United States. The club competes in USA Rugby South's third division.

History

ARFC was founded in 1973 by Jim "Jim Rugby" Macmillan and Danny Ferguson. Both ruggers had previously played rugby during their undergraduate college years. The pair were classmates at the Medical College of Georgia and started the team to serve as a much needed distraction for their fellow medical students. Thus, the MCG Mad Dogs were born -- "Mad Dogs" being derived from the abbreviation for "Medical Doctor" (MD).

The team has played on several fields over the years, converting football, soccer, softball and polo fields to passable rugby pitches. Ultimately, ARFC finalized an agreement with the city of Augusta, GA to lease unused property near downtown Augusta which led to the construction of Larry Bray Memorial Pitch, named after the late long-time "old boy" Larry Bray. The inaugural match was played on September 19, 2009, against Jacksonville Rugby with Augusta pulling out the win in the closing minutes of a very exciting match.

External links
 Augusta Furies Website
 Augusta RFC Facebook page
 Augusta RFC Website
 Georgia Rugby Union
 USA Rugby South Website

References

 Augusta RFC Website

Rugby union teams in Georgia (U.S. state)